Kalb Hesari (also Romanized as Kalb Ḩeşārī) is a village in Ali Sadr Rural District, Gol Tappeh District, Kabudarahang County, Hamadan Province, Iran. At the 2006 census, its population was 168, in 38 families.

References 

Populated places in Kabudarahang County